Clarissa Larisey (born July 2, 1999) is a Canadian soccer player who plays for Swedish Damallsvenskan club BK Häcken and the Canada national team.

Early life
Larisey began playing soccer at age eight with Goulbourn SC. Afterwards, she played youth soccer with West Ottawa SC and later moved to Ottawa South United, with whom she led the Ontario Youth Soccer League in scoring three times from 2014 to 2016. She also played with the provincial Team Ontario from 2014 to 2016.

College career
In 2017, she committed to the University of Memphis to play for the women's soccer team. She scored her first goal in her debut on August 18, 2017 against the Samford Bulldogs. In her freshman season, she was named to the AAC All-Rookie Team. In her sophomore season, she earned First Team All-Conference and First Team All-South Region honours and helped Memphis win their first AAC Tournament title and was named the tournament's Most Outstanding Offensive Player, after scoring the first two goals of a 3–0 win against USF. In her junior season, she  was named AAC Co-Offensive Player of the Year, AAC First Team All-Conference, and a Second Team All-American. As a senior, she was a AAC All-Conference Second Team.

Club career
In 2018, she played with West Ottawa SC in League1 Ontario, scoring three goals in four appearances.

In 2019, she joined Ottawa South United in League1 Ontario, making two appearances. On May 11, she scored nine goals in a 13–0 victory over North Mississauga SC.

In May 2021, she signed with Icelandic club Valur in the top tier Úrvalsdeild kvenna on a six-month contract. She made her debut on May 19 against ÍBV. With Valur, she won the league title in 2021.

In August 2021, she joined Scottish club Celtic in the Scottish Women's Premier League. She made her debut on September 5 against Aberdeen. She scored her first goal on September 29, 2021 against Motherwell. On March 26, 2022, she scored a goal 58 seconds into the match against Hibernian. In her debut season she won the League Cup and Scottish Cup with Celtic, On August 11, 2022, she scored a hat trick against Hibernian. At the time of her departure from the club during the 2022–23 season, she had been the leading scorer in the Scottish Women's Premier League, after scoring twelve goals through twelve league matches.

In January 2023, she joined Swedish club Häcken in the Damallsvenskan.

International career
In August 2022, she earned her first callup to the Canadian national team for a pair of friendly matches against Australia. She made her debut on September 3, 2022, coming on as a substitute. She was then subsequently called up for the team's next set of friendlies in October. On October 6, she earned her first assist against Argentina. Four days later on October 10, she scored her first international goal in a friendly against Morocco.

Personal life
Larisey is the cousin of fellow professional soccer player Tony Mikhael.

Career statistics

International

References

External links

Living people
1999 births
Canadian women's soccer players
Women's association football forwards
Canada women's international soccer players
Soccer players from Ottawa
League1 Ontario (women) players
West Ottawa SC players
Ottawa South United players
Valur (women's football) players
Celtic F.C. Women players
Úrvalsdeild kvenna (football) players
Scottish Women's Premier League players
Memphis Tigers women's soccer players
BK Häcken FF players